Miles  is a male name from the Latin miles, a soldier. The medieval knight was called miles in Medieval Latin, while in Classical Latin, miles meant simply soldier of any sort, including infantry.

People with the name
Miles (bishop of Susa) (d. c. 340)
Miles of Gloucester, 1st Earl of Hereford (d. 1143)
Miles of Plancy (d. 1174), Crusader knight
Miles de Cogan (fl. 1170s), Anglo-Norman knight
Miles de Angulo (fl. 1250s), Anglo-Irish knight
Miles of Marseilles (b. c. 1294), Jewish physician
Miles de Noyers (d. 1350), French diplomat
Miles Aiken, American basketball player
Miles Austin, American football player
Miles Berkeley, British botanist and clergyman
Miles Boykin (born 1996), American football player
Miles Brown (American football) (born 1997), American football player
Miles Browning, United States Navy admiral
Miles Dempsey, British Army general
Miles Davis, American jazz trumpeter
Miles Fleetwood, English politician
Miles Franklin, Australian author
Miles Heizer (born 1994), American actor 
Miles Holmwood, Canadian guitarist and record producer
Miles James, United States soldier
Miles Kane, English musician
Miles Lord, American jurist
Miles Malleson, English actor and screenwriter
Miles Mander, English actor
Miles Mikolas, American baseball player
Miles E. Mills, American politician
Miles Ocampo, Filipina actress
Miles Nightingall, British army officer
Miles Partridge, English courtier
Miles Plumlee, American basketball player
Miles Sanders (born 1997), American football player
Miles Sandys, English politician
Miles Stapleton of Bedale, English knight
Miles Teller, American actor
Miles Thomas, British businessman
Miles Walker, Manx politician
Miles Warren, New Zealand architect

Fictional
"Baby", protagonist in the film Baby Driver whose real name is Miles
Miles, a mule character in the animated movie Barnyard
Miles, a character in the animated series The Ridonculous Race
Miles, a character in the animated series Rimba Racer
Miles Archer, character in the novel The Maltese Falcon and its adaptations
Miles Axlerod, character and main antagonist of Cars 2
Miles Callisto, character in the animated television series Miles from Tomorrowland
Miles Bennett Dyson, character in the film Terminator 2: Judgment Day
Miles Edgeworth, character in the Ace Attorney series
Miles Hendon, character in the novel The Prince and the Pauper and its adaptations
Miles Hollingsworth, character in the television series Degrassi: The Next Generation
M (James Bond), character in the James Bond novels whose real name is Sir Miles Messervy
Miles Lennox, character in the television series Backstage
Miles Morales / Spider-Man, character from Marvel Comics
Miles Mayhem, antagonist of the animated television series M.A.S.K.
Miles Matheson, protagonist of the television series Revolution
Miles O'Brien (Star Trek), character in the Star Trek universe
Miles Papazian, character in the television series 24
Miles "Tails" Prower, fox character in the Sonic the Hedgehog series
Miles Quaritch, the central antagonist of Avatar and its  sequels
Miles Silverberg, character in the television series Murphy Brown
Miles Straume, character in the television series Lost
Miles Teg, character in the Dune universe
Miles Upshur, character in the video game Outlast
Miles Vorkosigan, character in the Vorkosigan Saga novels and stories
Miles Warren a.k.a. the Jackal, antagonist in Spider-Man comics
Major Miles, a character in the manga series Fullmetal Alchemist

See also
Miles (surname)
Myles (given name)

References

English masculine given names